This is an alphabetical list of notable South African actors.

Born in the 1900s
 Siegfried Mynhardt (1906–1996)

Born in the 1910s
 Donald Gray (1914–1976)
 Sid James (1913–1976)

Born in the 1920s

Born in the 1930s
 Lydia Mokgokoloshi (born 1939)
 Mary Twala (1939–2020)
 Washington Xisolo (1934–2017)

Born in the 1940s

Born in the 1950s

Born in the 1960s

Born in the 1970s

Born in the 1980s

Born in the 1990s

Born in the 2000s
 Greteli Fincham (born 2001)
 Paballo Koza (born 2002)
 Khosi Ngema (born 2000)
 Shalate Sekhabi (born 2000)
 Brent Vermeulen (born 2001)

Unknown birthdate
 Quanita Adams
 Lisa Fugard
 David Meyer
 Kate Normington
 Adrienne Pearce
 Hilton Pelser
 Leeanda Reddy

See also
 Cinema of South Africa
 Lists of actors
 List of South Africans
 Television in South Africa

References

South African